Bárna is a village and municipality in the comitat of Nógrád, Hungary. The village is the part of the Nohohrad-Nógrád UNESCO Global Geopark.

Population

References

Populated places in Nógrád County
Novohrad-Nógrád UNESCO Global Geopark